Trčova ( or) is a settlement on the left bank of the Drava River east of Maribor in northeastern Slovenia. It belongs to the City Municipality of Maribor.

References

External links
Trčova on Geopedia

Populated places in the City Municipality of Maribor